"Tore Down a la Rimbaud" is a song written by Northern Irish singer-songwriter Van Morrison and included on his 1985 album, A Sense of Wonder.

Composition
The title and theme of the song derives from French poet Arthur Rimbaud who became famous for his poetry at the age of fifteen in 1869 and who quit writing six years later. Morrison had begun writing the song in 1975 during the three-year professionally inactive time period after he released the album, Veedon Fleece.

Morrison has been quoted on the origins of the song:
[It was] during the period... between Veedon Fleece and A Period of Transition [that] I started "Tore Down a la Rimbaud" – after I read that [Rimbaud] stopped writing altogether when he was twenty-six, became an arms dealer or something. He never wrote a line after that. Ironically, that sorta got me writing again. Took a long time to finish, though – eight years before I got the rest of the lines. That's the longest I've ever carried a song around.
I'd been reading him [Rimbaud] when I got the original idea. The idea is ten or twelve years old, and I just rewrote it. I wasn't writing anything at all and I really didn't understand why. Sometimes I get over a block by just sitting down at a typewriter and typing what I've just done."

Reception
Cash Box called it "a musically and lyrically rich cut."

Other releases
A remastered version of "Tore Down a la Rimbaud"  is included on Morrison's 2007 compilation album, Still on Top - The Greatest Hits and on The Essential Van Morrison. However, the song failed to appear on his first compilation (and best selling album) The Best of Van Morrison.

Personnel
Van Morrison – vocals, piano
John Allair – organ
Bob Doll – trumpet
Tom Donlinger – drums
Pee Wee Ellis – tenor saxophone
David Hayes – bass
Pauline Lazano – backing vocals
Chris Michie – guitar
Bianca Thornton – backing vocals

Notes

References
Collis, John (1996). Inarticulate Speech of the Heart, Little Brown and Company,  
Heylin, Clinton (2003). Can You Feel the Silence? Van Morrison: A New Biography, Chicago Review Press 

1985 singles
Van Morrison songs
Songs written by Van Morrison
1984 songs
Song recordings produced by Van Morrison
Mercury Records singles